Xylanimonas is a Gram-positive and non-spore-forming bacterial genus from the family Promicromonosporaceae.

References

Further reading 
 

Micrococcales
Bacteria genera